Lieutenant General Kathleen M. Gainey is a retired United States Army general who served as Deputy Commander, United States Transportation Command at Scott Air Force Base, Illinois. She retired in 2013.

Education
 1978 Bachelor of Science Degree in Special Education, Old Dominion University, VA
 1987 Master of Business Administration in Contract Management and Procurement, Babson College, MA.
 1989 Army Command and General Staff College, Fort Leavenworth, KS.
 1997 Graduate, Army War College, Carlisle Barracks, PA.

Military career
Gainey received her commission as a second lieutenant through ROTC in 1978. Her commands include:
5th Heavy Boat Company, Ford Island, Hawaii
6th Transportation Battalion, Fort Eustis, Virginia
7th Corps Support Group, Warner Barracks in Bamberg, Germany
Defense Distribution Center, New Cumberland, Pennsylvania
Commanding General, Surface Deployment and Distribution Command, headquartered at Scott Air Force Base, Illinois

Gainey's other assignments include
Chief, Container Freight Branch, Military Ocean Terminal Bay Area, MTMC Western Area, Oakland, California
Program Analyst, US Army Armament, Munitions and Chemical Command, Rock Island, Illinois
Executive Officer, 2d Area Support Group, 22d Support Command
S-2/S3, 702d Transportation Battalion, Saudi Arabia
Division Transportation Officer, 24th Infantry Division (Mechanized), Fort Stewart, Georgia
Special Assistant to the Chief of Staff, Army, Washington, D.C.
Chief Joint Operations Division, United States Transportation Command, Scott Air Force Base, Illinois
Director, Force Projection and Distribution, Office of the Deputy Chief of Staff, G-4, Washington, D.C.
Deputy Chief of Staff, Resources and Sustainment, Multi-National Force-Iraq, Operation Iraqi Freedom.
 Director of Logistics, Joint Staff J4

References

Babson College alumni
Female generals of the United States Army
Living people
Old Dominion University alumni
Recipients of the Defense Distinguished Service Medal
Recipients of the Defense Superior Service Medal
Recipients of the Distinguished Service Medal (US Army)
Recipients of the Legion of Merit
United States Army personnel of the Gulf War
United States Army personnel of the Iraq War
Year of birth missing (living people)
21st-century American women